Re Hydrodan (Corby) Ltd [1994] 2 BCLC 180 is a UK company law case, concerning the meaning of a shadow director. It is sometimes incorrectly cited in sources as Re: Hydrodam.

Facts

There were two corporate directors of a parent company of Hydrodan (Corby) Ltd, which was a wholly owned subsidiary of Landsaver MCP Ltd, itself a wholly owned subsidiary of Midland City Partnerships Ltd, which was, finally, a wholly owned subsidiary of Eagle Trust plc, a TV conglomerate chaired by David James, Baron James of Blackheath. The liquidator alleged that the two directors of Eagle Trust, Leslie Thomas and Dr Hardwick, were liable for wrongful trading, and contended they were liable as shadow directors under the Companies Act 2006 section 251.

Judgment
Millett J held the directors of the parent were not shadow directors of the subsidiary, just by being members of the parent company’s board. It would need to be shown that they personally instructed and directed the subsidiary’s board. The first step is to identify the de jure and de facto directors, then to say that they had been directed, then that the real directors acted in accordance with the directions, and then that they were accustomed to do so. For instance there must be a pattern ‘in which the board did not exercise any discretion or judgment of its own but acted in accordance with the directions of others’. De facto directors are those who ‘undertook functions in relation to the company which could properly be discharged only by a director. It is not sufficient to show that he was concerned in the management of the company’s affairs or undertook tasks in relation to its business which can properly be performed by a manager below board level.’

See also
 (directors of a corporate director are not necessarily shadow directors)

References

United Kingdom company case law
High Court of Justice cases
1993 in case law
1993 in British law